Ras Diba is the name of a cape in Fujairah.

References 

Geography of the Emirate of Fujairah
Headlands of the United Arab Emirates